Donald or Don Marquis may refer to:

Don Marquis (1878–1937), American humorist, journalist and author
Don Marquis (philosopher) (born 1935), American moral philosopher
Donald Marquis (psychologist) (1908–1973), president of the American Psychological Association